The men's 3000 metres steeplechase event at the 2007 European Athletics U23 Championships was held in Debrecen, Hungary, at Gyulai István Atlétikai Stadion on 13 and 15 July.

Medalists

Results

Final
15 July

Heats
13 July
Qualified: first 4 in each heat and 4 best to the Final

Heat 1

Heat 2

Participation
According to an unofficial count, 21 athletes from 12 countries participated in the event.

 (1)
 (3)
 (1)
 (3)
 (1)
 (3)
 (1)
 (2)
 (1)
 (3)
 (1)
 (1)

References

3000 metres steeplechase
Steeplechase at the European Athletics U23 Championships